This is a very short list of rivers in Kenya. This list is arranged by drainage basin, with respective tributaries indented under each larger stream's name.

Mediterranean Sea

Nile
White Nile
Victoria Nile (Uganda)
Lake Victoria
Nzoia River
Yala River
Nyando River
Sondu River (Miriu River)
Awach River
Itare River
Kitare River (South Awach River)
Gucha River (Kuja River)
Migori River
Riana River
Mogonga River
Mara River

Lake Turkana
Suguta River
Kerio River
Lokichar River (Lomenyangaparat)
Turkwel River
Suam River
Omo River
Turkwel River

Lake Baringo

Olarabel River (Ngusero River)
Molo River
Perkerra River
Njoro River

Lake Naivasha
Gilgil River
Malewa River
Turasha River (Kija river)

Lake Natron
Southern Ewaso Ng'iro
Seyabei River

Indian Ocean

Jubba River (Somalia)
Lagh Dera
Lak Bor
Lagh Kutulo
Lagh Bogal
Ewaso Ng'iro
Isiolo River
Naro Moru river
Milgis
Dawa River
Tana River
Kathita River
Mutonga River
Thiba River
Thika River
Kiama River
Ragati River
Kururu River
Muhuhi River
Galana River
Athi River
Mbagathi River
Ruiru River
Nairobi River
Tsavo River
Tudor Creek
Voi River (Goshi River)
Umba River
Pangani River (Tanzania)
Jipe Ruvu River
Lumi River

References

External links
U.S. Defense Mapping Agency, Operational Navigation Chart Series, 1973
GEOnet Names Server

Kenya
Rivers